Arlington is a town in Shelby County, Tennessee, United States. The population was 2,569 at the 2000 census, 11,517 at the 2010 census, and 14,549 at the 2020 Census. From 2010 until 2020 the town's population grew by 26.326%. It is one of the seven municipalities in Shelby County. The town lies wholly within the borders of Shelby County.

Government 
Arlington "follows a general law Mayor-Alderman charter" according to the official website of the town. The current mayor is Mike Wissman. Arlington has six alderman.

History
Arlington has remained a small quiet rural town for two centuries.

Settlers came to the area in the 1830s, and many of their descendants still live in the town. Originally known as Haysville, the town was named after the original landowner, Samuel Jackson Hays, a nephew of President Andrew Jackson. The area began to grow with the development of the Memphis and Ohio Railroad and the creation of Withe Depot within its boundaries. By 1856, about 200 people called Haysville home. The outbreak of yellow fever in Memphis in 1878 contributed to the stagnant population as the town fathers quarantined the area, forbidding outsiders from entering the town. The town was incorporated as Haysville in 1878.

In 1883 the town's name was changed to Arlington due to the post office being unable to use the name Haysville. In 1900 the town was incorporated again. Captain Henry Pittman, who lived in Haysville, had visited Washington, D.C. and Arlington National Cemetery and was inspired to call the town Arlington.

The economic crash of 1929 led to a small economic depression in the town, but Arlington's economy gradually grew out of it due to the major change of highway 70 opening the town to outside businesses.

The towns first school was opened up in 1884. "Memphis District High School", which was located on what is now known as "College Hill." The school only taught up to a high school level, but locally it was named "The College".

Arlington has a range of historical buildings that bring its past into view for all interested parties. Starting with the Rachel H.K. Museum, which is a museum in Arlington that has historical pieces of Arlington. Next is Arlington's Blacksmith shop. There are fewer than 1,000 nationwide, and Arlington's is an important one to the small town’s history. It was made in the 1800s and still is put to use during certain events throughout the year.

Geography

Demographics

2020 Census

As of the 2020 United States census, there were 14,549 people, 3,560 households, and 3,046 families residing in the town.

2010 Census
At the 2010 census there were 11,517 people, and 3,739 households. The racial makeup of the town was 81.24% White, 13.84% African American, 0.16% Native American, 1.80% Asian, 0.86% from other races, 2.08% from two or more races, and .02% from Native Hawaiian and Other Pacific Islander. Hispanic or Latino of any race were 2.98%.

Of the 3,907 households 35.23% were 1-2 person occupied, 48.02% were 3-4 person occupied, 15.32% were 5-6 person occupied, 1.42% were 7 or more person households and 4.2% were listed as unoccupied. With the 3,907 households owned in Arlington, they are estimated to have a median value of $217,300.

The age distribution was 37.53% under the age of 18, 3.47% from 18 to 24, 35.62% from 25 to 44, 19.20% from 45 to 64, and 4.19% 65 or older. The median age was 32.2 years. The population was 49% male and 51% female.

From 2013 to 2017, Arlington's estimated household income was predicted to be $99,404. This has increased since 2009, when the household income was estimated to be $85,779.

2000 Census
At the 2000 census there were 2,569 people, 794 households, and 669 families in the town. The racial makeup of the town was 74.23% White, 23.01% African American, 0.47% Native American, 0.62% Asian, 0.54% from other races, and 1.13% from two or more races. Hispanic or Latino of any race were 1.13%.

Of the 794 households 42.8% had children under the age of 18 living with them, 67.1% were married couples living together, 13.5% had a female householder with no husband present, and 15.7% were non-families. 12.2% of households were one person and 5.7% were one person aged 65 or older. The average household size was 2.88 and the average family size was 3.15.

The age distribution was 26.1% under the age of 18, 5.8% from 18 to 24, 37.6% from 25 to 44, 22.6% from 45 to 64, and 8.0% 65 or older. The median age was 36 years. For every 100 females, there were 97.5 males. For every 100 females age 18 and over, there were 92.8 males.

The median household income was $52,870 and the median family income  was $55,602. Males had a median income of $38,438 versus $29,138 for females. The per capita income for the town was $19,569. About 3.1% of families and 11.3% of the population were below the poverty line, including 4.4% of those under age 18 and 23.2% of those age 65 or over.

Education
Arlington is served by Arlington Community Schools and Shelby County Schools.

Arlington boasts having a student-teacher ratio of 18 to 1.

There are four schools located within the municipality of Arlington:
Arlington Elementary School K-5
Donelson Elementary School K-5
Arlington Middle School 6-8
Arlington High School 9-12

Arlington Community schools was created in 2014, and it started with an enrollment of 4907 kids.

There are two schools in Arlington served by Shelby County Schools:

 Barret's Chapel School (K-8, Shelby County Schools)
Bolton High School 9-12

References

External links
 Town of Arlington official website
 Arlington Chamber of Commerce

Towns in Shelby County, Tennessee
Memphis metropolitan area
Towns in Tennessee